(3 January 1934 – 15 February 2021) was a Japanese painter. He was born in Okayama, Japan, but was based in France.

Life and career
1956　Bachelor's degree in Physics. Okayama University, Japan.
1963　Arrived in France from Japan. Beaux-Arts, Paris.
Professor Brianchon studio, followed by Professor Mattey.
1971　Gold Medal for watercolours.  Le Salon Salon des Artistes Français.
1974　Gold Medal for oil painting. Member Hors Concours (HC) Le Salon Salon des Artistes Français.
1975　Award of the President of the French Republic, International Art Exhibition, Toulon, President of jury Edouard Pignon, France.
1991　Charles Cottet Prize. National Exhibition of Fine Arts, France.
1994　Navy Blue Ribbon Medal by Japanese Government.
1998　Second Navy Blue Ribbon Medal by Japanese Government.
2000  Gold Medal for engraving. Grimaldi Castle and Museum, France.
2002　Puvis de Chavanne Prize. National Exhibition of Fine Arts, France.
2002　Honor Medal of the Japanese Minister of Foreign Affairs.
2005　Order of the Rising Sun, gold rays with rosette, Japan.
2006  Who's Who Prize. Le Salon, Art en Capital, Grand Palais, France.
2011　Award of picture 2011, Salon d'automne, France.
2014　Knight of the Order of Arts and Letters, France.
2014　VERDAGUER's Prize of the painting 2014 of the Institut de France by Académie des beaux-arts, France.
2019  Medal of Honor by Mayor of Paris 15th, France.

Public exhibitions in France
1978–1979:　"My Paris" Carnavalet Museum of the City Paris.
1986:　"AKAGI - Paris Architecture"  College Students’ Youth Club.
1993:　"Akagi's Paris" Étoile Mitsukoshi Space (an event for the 10th anniversary of the two towns' friendship: Paris–Tokyo)
1998:　"Akagi's Paris " Trocadéro Library.
2002:　"Akagi – From the country of the rising sun to eastern Paris" (Town hall of Paris 20th district)
2002:　"Invited artist for the year’s retrospective" (with Kisling) Independents' Salon.
2004:　"Akagi, 40 years in Paris, 1963–2003" Paris-Museum, Archaeological Crypt.
2008:　"France Japan: one century and half cross-looks, Mathurin Méheut, Kojiro Akagi " Town hall of Paris 9th district and, in parallel, at the House of Brittany.
2009:　"Kojiro Akagi known and unknown" Town hall of Paris 5th district.
2012:　"Akagi Exhibition, Yôkoso! Paris" Town halls of Paris 5th and 8th districts.
2015:　"Akagi at the Pyramide of Saint-Amand-Montround city" Saint-Amand-Montround.
2016:　"Akagi - one hundred views of Paris" Castle and Garden of Villandry, Loire France.
2019:  "85years Mr AKAGI"  Town hall of Paris 15th.

Associations
1963 Member of the Japanese Artists Association, Japan.
1968　Member of Salon des Independents, France.
1970　Member of Salon d'Automne, France.
1970 Associate member of French Artist society (outside competition member since 1974)
1973　Member of Salon National des Beaux-Arts, France.
1982 Committee Member Salon International des Beaux-Arts,  France.
2002 Honorary vice-president Salon National des Beaux-Arts, France.

Museum collections

1975  Toulon City Museum, France
1979–1981, 1987, 1991–1993, 2013  Carnavalet Museum of Paris (128 works of art: 3 oil paintings and 125 watercolors), France.
1981–2013 Cernuschi Museum, Paris, (1 painting, 1 engraving), France.
1981–2002 MOA Museum of Atami (2 oil paintings and 1 watercolor), Japan.
1991　Vatican Museum, Department of religious modern arts, Italy
1993　Royal Ueno Museum, Tokyo (1 oil painting). Culture Prefectural Kyoto Museum City of Kyoto (1 oil painting), Japan.
1993–1998 Prefectural Museum of Okayama (5 oil paintings, 2 watercolors and 53 illustrations of Sany Newspaper), Japan.
1993–2005 Kurashiki City Modern Museum (3 oil paintings), Japan.
1998–2009 WAKO Museum, Kasaoka (3 oil paintings), Japan.
2000 Grimaldi Castle and Museum (2 silk-screens), France.
2001　Nariwa City Museum (1 watercolor), Japan.
2002–2014　Grez-sur-Loing City Museum (1 oil painting and 2 watercolors), France.
2003–2005  Patricia Clark Museum (1 oil painting, 2 watercolors), Iowa, USA.
2014　Toulouse-Lautrec Museum of Albi (1 watercolor), France.

Collectives collections
1971–1973  French State (2 oil paintings), France.
1983　Saidaiji High School (1 oil painting) Okayama, Japan.
1986　Foyer des Lycennes (1 oil painting) Paris, France.
1993　Okayama City Hall (1 oil painting), Japan.
1996-2006 Embassy of Japan (1 oil painting and 2 watercolors), France.
1997　Sanyo High School for Girls, Okayama (1 oil painting and 2 engravings), Japan.
1998　Trocadero Library, Paris (1 engraving) France.
2000 Okayama University  (1 engraving), Japan.
1975–2010 National Library, Paris (collection engraving), France.
2011　Japanese cultural center in Paris (1 oil painting) Paris, France.
2014  Prefecture of Okayama (1 oil painting), Okayama, Japan.
2018  Maison franco-japonais (1 oil painting), Ebisu,Tokyo, Japan.
2019  Town Hall of Paris 15th (1 oil painting), France.

References

External links
  

Japanese painters
1934 births
2021 deaths
Recipients of the Order of the Rising Sun, 4th class
Chevaliers of the Ordre des Arts et des Lettres
People from Okayama
Place of death missing
Artists from Okayama Prefecture